Ján Gabriel  (born 18 April 1962) is a Slovak former professional footballer who played as a midfielder, mostly for FC Spartak Trnava.

Club career
Gabriel was born in Trnava. He played for DAC Dunajská Streda and FC Spartak Trnava in Slovakia, and had spells with Bursaspor and Zeytinburnuspor in the Turkish Super Lig.

References

External links
 

1962 births
Living people
Sportspeople from Trnava
Slovak footballers
Association football midfielders
FC Spartak Trnava players
Bursaspor footballers
Zeytinburnuspor footballers
Slovak expatriate footballers
Slovak expatriate sportspeople in Turkey
Expatriate footballers in Turkey